New York State Route 133 (NY 133) is an  long state highway in Westchester County, New York, in the United States. It begins at U.S. Route 9 (US 9) in the village of Ossining, goes through several hamlets in the town of New Castle (Millwood and Tompkins Corners), and ends at NY 117 in the village of Mount Kisco.

NY 133 between Ossining and the junction with NY 100 in New Castle was part of the Croton Turnpike, which connected Ossining to the hamlet of Somers, established in 1807. Dissolved by the state in 1849, the turnpike become a public road, and the section was added to the state highway system between 1903 and 1917. The portion of NY 133 from NY 100 to Mount Kisco became a state highway in 1908, after construction by William McCabe, a local general contractor. The alignment was designated as NY 133 in the 1930 state highway renumbering.

Route description

NY 133 begins in the downtown of Ossining village at an intersection with US 9 (North Highland Avenue). NY 133 proceeds northeast through Ossining as Croton Avenue, a two-lane commercial street. Winding northeast for several blocks, NY 133 passes multiple apartment buildings before intersecting with the southern terminus of NY 134 (Dale Avenue). At NY 134, NY 133 turns closer to the east, crossing into a large residential section of Ossining after Linden Avenue. NY 133 winds eastward for several blocks, becoming a commercial/residential street through the town of Ossining, winding eastward for a distance into a grade-separated interchange with NY 9A (the Briarcliff–Peekskill Parkway).

After crossing NY 9A, NY 133 continues eastward through Ossining, changing names to Somerstown Road. Now a two-lane residential road, NY 133 bends northeastward, winding through town. At Brookside Road, the route continues northeast, changing names to Somerstown Turnpike. The route remains similar in design for several miles, crossing into the town of New Castle as a two-lane residential road. NY 133 soon intersects with NY 100 (Saw Mill River Road), forming a concurrency through New Castle. After the junction, NY 133 and NY 100 enter an interchange with the Taconic State Parkway, which uses ramps from Campfire Road. After this interchange, the routes enter the hamlet of Millwood.

The concurrency ends as NY 133 turns northeast on Station Place, passing a strip mall as it bends north along Station Place. After the bend, the route becomes a two-lane residential/commercial street through Millwood, passing the former site of the Millwood station of the New York Central Railroad's Putnam Division. This station was demolished in May 2012 after years of neglect. Just after the former station, NY 133 intersects with NY 120 (Shingle House Road). At this intersection, NY 133 and NY 120 become concurrent along the street now known as Millwood Road (formerly Shingle House). The two routes wind eastward along a two-lane residential road, passing Gedney Park and leaving the hamlet of Millwood. A short distance to the northeast of Millwood, NY 120 forks east on Quaker Road, while NY 133 continues north on Millwood.

NY 133 continues northeast on Millwood Road as a two-lane residential street, winding through the town of New Castle, passing numerous homes for a couple miles. This section is often referred to as "Hawk Alley." After making a turn to the east, NY 133 intersects with Seven Bridges Road (unsigned County Route 5 (CR 5)). The route winds eastward after CR 5, soon starting the same wind towards the northeast. The residences give way to dense woods, with NY 133 soon entering the village of Mount Kisco. Just after crossing into Mount Kisco, NY 133 enters an interchange with exit 34 of the Saw Mill River Parkway. Now known as West Main Street, NY 133 is a two-lane residential street for several blocks, soon bending southeast at Kisco Avenue. Here the name changes to Main Street, and NY 133 passes the Mount Kisco Metro-North station. Three blocks from the train station, the route enters Feigel Square, where it intersects with NY 117 (North Bedford Road), which serves as the eastern terminus of NY 133.

History

The alignment of NY 133 through the town of New Castle was part of the former Croton Turnpike (also known as the Somerstown Turnpike), which connected the town of Somers with the village of Sing Sing (current-day Ossining). The Croton Turnpike Company was established on April 6, 1807 by charter from the New York State Assembly at the cost of 12.5 cents per wagon with at least two horses. By the middle of the 19th century, the Croton Turnpike had been dissolved, after an 1849 request to repeal the charter  given in 1807 had passed the Assembly.

The first piece of NY 133 upgraded to state highway standards was the alignment concurrent with current-day NY 100 in Millwood. Designated State Highway 143 (SH 143), the alignment was first contracted in 1903 for a  segment of macadam. The project cost $30,430.00 (1903 USD) with the state covering half the cost ($15,215.00). The contract was let on June 15, 1903, construction was completed and accepted into the state highway system on December 21, 1903.

The alignment of NY 133 between current-day NY 100 in Millwood and the Mount Kisco village line, designated SH 768, was upgraded to state highway standards in the early 20th century. A contract was let on November 26, 1907 to the contractor William F. McCabe for a total of $36,775.38 (1907 USD; $ in 2013 USD) for the  segment. McCabe would use New York State-approved stones for the roadway, with sand to sustain the road. When the contract was completed, the project to upgrade the road cost $39,924.03 (1907 USD). The project was completed in October 1908, being accepted into the state highway system on October 19.

On August 31, 1915, the portion of NY 133 between the border of the village of Ossining and NY 100, designated SH 1307, was contracted for an upgrade. The  segment cost $28,313.22 (1915 USD), with the state giving in $18,402.94 in funds for the project. The project was completed in 1918 and entered the state highway system on August 27.

NY 133 was created in the 1930 state highway renumbering, with no major changes to its alignment since then.

Major intersections

See also

References

External links

133
Transportation in Westchester County, New York